Henry Webber was Dean of Exeter between  1459 and 1477.

Notes

Deans of Exeter